The Sheldon Block is an historic structure located at 822 6th Avenue in San Diego's Gaslamp Quarter, in the U.S. state of California. It was built in 1888.

See also
 List of Gaslamp Quarter historic buildings

External links

 

1888 establishments in California
Buildings and structures completed in 1888
Buildings and structures in San Diego
Gaslamp Quarter, San Diego